The International Congress of Americanists (ICA) is an international academic conference for research in multidisciplinary studies of the Americas.  Established August 25, 1875 in Nancy, France, the scholars' forum has met regularly since its inception, presently in three year increments, with the exception of during the conflict of World War II. Its meeting location alternates between Europe and the Americas.  Congress members come from a variety of disciplines, including anthropology, archaeology, art, education, economy, geography, history, human rights, law, philosophy, linguistics, sociology, and urban studies.

A wide variety of subjects have been presented at the various conferences. Father Émile Petitot spoke at the 1875 Congress on the matter of the Asiatic origin of Inuit and North American Indians. Precipitated by a comment from Franz Boas, a "lively controversy" occurred at the 1902 conference in New York City over the coined word "Amerind". At the 1910 session in Mexico City, Marcos E. Becerra presented a paper on Hernán Cortés's 1524–25 expedition to Las Hibueras. The International Work Group for Indigenous Affairs, a co-operative of academic anthropologist researchers and human rights activists, was first proposed at the Munich/Stuttgart conference in August 1968. The 1982 congress in Manchester included the largest conference ever convened on the Amazon basin. At the 1988 congress in Amsterdam, researchers organized a symposium agreeing to create a European network for the interchange of information about Latin America produced in Europe which was the precursor for REDIAL.

The president of the 53rd Congress was the Mexican anthropologist Elio Masferrer Kan.  The event took place July 19–24, 2009, in Mexico City. The 54th Congress took place July 15–20, 2012 in Vienna (Austria), and was organized by the University of Vienna, the Austrian Latin America Institute and the Museum of Ethnology, Vienna. The 55th Congress was held in San Salvador, El Salvador, from July 12–17, 2015 with the theme "Conflict, Peace, and Construction of Identities in the Americas."

Dates and locations

 1875, Nancy
 1877, Luxembourg
 1879, Brussels
 1881, Madrid
 1883, Copenhagen
 1886, Turin
 1888, Berlin
 1890, Paris
 1892, Huelva
 1894, Stockholm
 1895, Mexico City
 1900, Paris
 1902, New York
 1904, Stuttgart
 1906, Quebec
 1908, Vienna
 1910, Buenos Aires (Part 1); Mexico City (Part 2)
 1912, London
 1915, Washington
 1922, Rio de Janeiro

 1924, The Hague (Part 1); Göteborg (Part 2)
 1926, Rome
 1928, New York
 1930, Hamburg
 1932, La Plata
 1935, Seville
 1939, Mexico City (Part 1); Lima (Part 2)
 1947, Paris
 1949, New York
 1952, Cambridge
 1954, São Paulo
 1956, Copenhagen
 1958, San Jose de Costa Rica
 1960, Vienna
 1962, Mexico City
 1964, Madrid–Barcelona–Seville
 1966, Mar del Plata
 1968, Stuttgart–Munich
 1970, Lima
 1972, Rome–Geneve

 1974, Mexico City
 1976, Paris
 1979, Vancouver
 1982, Manchester
 1985, Bogota
 1988, Amsterdam
 1991, New Orleans
 1994, Stockholm–Göteborg
 1997, Quito
 2000, Warsaw
 2003, Santiago de Chile
 2006, Seville
 2009, Mexico City
 2012, Vienna
 2015, San Salvador, El Salvador
 2018, Salamanca
 2021, Foz do Iguaçu

References

External links
 
 Guide to the International Congress of Americanists Records, 1949-1953
 First Call for Papers 55th ICA accessed May 10, 2014

1875 establishments
Americas
Academic conferences